Henri Calef (20 July 1910 – 18 August 1994) was a French screenwriter and film director.

Selected filmography

Director
 Jericho (1946)
 The Royalists (1947)
 Crossroads of Passion (1948)
 Shadow and Light (1951)
 The Passerby (1951)
 The Secret of Helene Marimon (1954)

Writer
 The Lafarge Case (1938)

External links 
 

1910 births
1994 deaths
French film directors
French male screenwriters
20th-century French screenwriters
Film people from Plovdiv
20th-century French male writers